Abdul Fatawu Issahaku (born 8 March 2004) is a Ghanaian professional footballer who plays as an attacking midfielder or a winger for Sporting CP and the Ghana national team.

Issahaku has been described by British news outlet, The Guardian as arguably the greatest African prospect of his generation and was named in the outlet's "Next Generation 2021.

Club career

Steadfast 
In 2019, at the age of fifteen, Issahaku started his career with Tamale-based club Steadfast FC, in the Zone One of the Division One League, the Ghanaian second tier. During his debut season, he immediately established himself as one of the most talented players in the league, scoring eight goals and assisting five in 13 matches before the league was halted due to the COVID-19 pandemic.

In his second season, he scored 12 goals and made 12 assists in 14 league matches and picked up 8 man of the match awards. In 2021, after the Africa U-20 Cup of Nations, Fatawu was linked with several European teams, being some of them Liverpool, Bayer 04 Lervekusen, and Sporting CP. In October 2021, Issahaku joined Dreams on a loan until 2022. In the same month, he was included in The Guardian's "Next Generation 2021", and was described by them as "arguably the best African prospect of his generation".

Sporting CP 
In April 2022, he was signed by Sporting CP on a five year contract with a release clause of 60 million euros. This brought finality to rumors of him joining Sporting CP on loan from Liverpool and other transfer saga rumour. Prior to signing officially Issahaku had been at the club since February and had been training with the U-23 side. As he was an under age player at the time, and with the season already ongoing, he couldn't be registered with the first-team until the 2022–23 season, then, he began to train with the B team until available to play for the professional team.

Ahead of the 2022–23 season, Issahaku was named in the squad for pre-season training and tour for the first team. He was involved in the team's preparations prior to the start of the season playing his first pre-season game against Belgium side Royale Union. On 7 August 2022, he was named on the bench for the first match of the season. The following weekend he made his debut after coming on in the 80th minute for Francisco Trincão in Sporting CP's 3–0 victory over Rio Ave.

International career

Youth team 
In 2018, Issahaku was part of Ghana's U17 squad, managed by Karim Zito. The team managed to reach the finals of the 2018 WAFU Zone B U-17 Cup of Nations. They however lost in the final to rivals Nigeria via a 3–1 penalty shootout after a 1–1 draw after regulation time, with Isshaku missing his penalty in the shootout.

Issahaku represented Ghana and served as captain of the national under-17 team in 2020, playing during the 2021 Africa U-17 Cup of Nations qualifiers. At the tournament he scored the equalizing penalty in Ghana's 1–1 draw against Nigeria. Ghana were eliminated from the competition after losing 3–1 against Ivory Coast. Ghana's only goal of the game was assisted by Issahaku.

The following year, due to his impressive form, he was promoted into the under-20 squad at the age of 16, despite being much younger than most part of his teammates. He was later selected to take part in the 2021 Africa U-20 Cup of Nations. During the competition, he played all of the Black Satellites' matches, scoring two goals in the group stages to help his side win the title for the fourth time in its history. In that occasion, he was also adjudged as the Best Player of the Tournament.

Senior team 
In March 2021, after his exploits with the U-20 side, he was given his first call-up to the senior team by C.K. Akonnor, as the Black Stars challenged South Africa and São Tomé and Príncipe in two qualifying matches for the Africa Cup of Nations. He was given the call up along with Philomon Baffour and Ibrahim Danlad, both his teammates from the U-20 AFCON winning team.

He scored a free-kick goal against Uzbekistan when the Black Stars' B Team played Uzbekistan at the Markaziy Stadium. Even though the game ended 2–1 for Uzbekistan, Fatawu was highly praised by his performance.

In September 2021, Fatawu made his debut for the Black Stars in a 3–1 victory over Zimbabwe in a 2022 FIFA World Cup qualifier. Fatawu made the 28-man  squad for 2021 Africa Cup of Nations. He was the youngest player in the Ghanaian team and the fourth youngest at the tournament. On 27 September 2021, Fatawu scored his debut goal for the Ghana senior team against Nicaragua.

Career statistics

Club

International

 Scores and results list Ghana's goal tally first, score column indicates score after each Issahaku goal.

Honours 
Ghana U17
 WAFU U-17 Cup of Nations runner-up: 2018

Ghana U20
 Africa U-20 Cup of Nations: 2021
Individual
 Africa U-20 Cup of Nations Best Player: 2021
 Africa U-20 Cup of Nations Best XI: 2021
Odartey Lamptey Future Star Award: 2021
SWAG Discovery of the Year: 2021
Ghana Premier League Player of the Month: November 2021

References

External links 
 
 

2004 births
Living people
Ghanaian footballers
Ghana international footballers
Ghana youth international footballers
Ghana under-20 international footballers
People from Tamale, Ghana
Association football midfielders
2021 Africa Cup of Nations players
2022 FIFA World Cup players